Kelowna West, formerly Westside-Kelowna, is a provincial electoral district in British Columbia, Canada, established by the Electoral Districts Act, 2008. It was first contested in the 2009 general election. The riding was created out of parts of Okanagan-Westside, Kelowna-Lake Country and Kelowna-Mission. It was renamed Kelowna West in the 2015 electoral redistribution with only minor boundary changes.

Just weeks after the 2013 British Columbia election, newly re-elected MLA Ben Stewart resigned to allow Premier Christy Clark, who had lost her own seat, to run in a by-election.

Clark resigned the seat and leadership of the BC Liberals effective August 4, 2017, after losing a confidence vote. A by-election for the seat was held on February 14, 2018.

Geography
The riding contains the city of West Kelowna, all of the Regional District of Central Okanagan west of Lake Okanagan and north of Peachland and the central part of the city of Kelowna.

Members of the Legislative Assembly

Electoral history

Kelowna West

Westside-Kelowna 

 

 

|}

References

British Columbia provincial electoral districts
Politics of Kelowna
West Kelowna